Bernard Schuiteman (born October 3, 1973) is a Dutch former football defender. Born in Garderen, Gelderland, he began his professional career in the 1993–94 season with Bayer 04 Leverkusen. He later played with Feyenoord Rotterdam, FC Utrecht, Grazer AK, 1. FSV Mainz 05, SpVgg Unterhaching, Apollon Limassol and Cambuur Leeuwarden.

External links
 
  Profile

Living people
1973 births
People from Barneveld
Footballers from Gelderland
Association football defenders
Dutch footballers
Dutch expatriate footballers
Apollon Limassol FC players
Feyenoord players
Bayer 04 Leverkusen players
1. FSV Mainz 05 players
SpVgg Unterhaching players
FC Utrecht players
SC Cambuur players
Grazer AK players
Eredivisie players
Eerste Divisie players
Bundesliga players
Austrian Football Bundesliga players
Cypriot First Division players
Expatriate footballers in Germany
Expatriate footballers in Austria
Expatriate footballers in Cyprus